The Nike Smoke was a sounding rocket, part of a research project on the behavior of the horizontal winds in the upper atmosphere, developed by NASA in the 1960s based on the Nike booster. The goal was to obtain more accurate data on the behavior of these winds in order to guide the design of new vehicles particularly the Saturn family of vehicles. Nike Smoke used the release of titanium tetrachloride at altitude to create a smoke trail at altitude. The release created a white smoke trail which when photographed from two cameras situated 10–12 miles from the launch site and 90 degrees apart. Comparison of the photographs allowed winds aloft to be calculated in both direction and velocity.

Origins 
In the early 1960s, NASA's Nike Smoke project was developed at the Langley Research Center and Marshall Space Flight Center laboratories, to study horizontal wind speed and its influence on rocket flights. The Nike booster was chosen due to its high reliability and availability, as thousands were manufactured to meet the requirements of Project Nike.

Its cone-shaped tip, with an air intake tube, a tank and an exhaust valve, was specially developed for the mission. In the tank were placed 37 litres of titanium tetrachloride in order to produce a highly reflective and dense smoke trail, hence its name. This trail extended from an altitude of around 6,000 feet to 75,000 feet. The triangulation of this trail provided data much more precise than previous tests made with high-altitude balloons.

Development 

The project's head was Harold Tolefson, along with his engineers Charles Dozier, Robert Henry and Robert Miller.

It was intended to launch about a hundred rockets within a 1-year period from Cape Kennedy, where the launch site was built adjacent to Cape Canaveral Air Force Station. The first launch was successfully conducted on May 17, 1962.

From May 1962 until May 1963, a total of 55 Nike Smokes were launched from Cape Kennedy. From July 1963 until January 1965, more than 70 Nike Smokes were launched from their Wallops Island launch site. The rocket proved to be an effective and cheap method to study wind patterns at high altitudes.

See also
 Sounding rocket

References

External links
  Nike] 
  Nike Smoke Sounding Rocket]* NASA - Wind Velocity Profiles by the Smoke-Trail method - Wallops Island, 1965-1969
 NASA - Cultural Resources Nike Smoke YouTube video.

Nike (rocket family)